The white-browed scimitar babbler (Pomatorhinus schisticeps) is a species of bird in the family Timaliidae.
It is found in Bangladesh, Bhutan, Cambodia, India, Laos, Myanmar, Nepal, Thailand, and Vietnam.
Its natural habitats are subtropical or tropical moist lowland forest and subtropical or tropical moist montane forest.

Notes

References
Collar, N. J. & Robson, C. 2007. Family Timaliidae (Babblers)  pp. 70 – 291 in; del Hoyo, J., Elliott, A. & Christie, D.A. eds. Handbook of the Birds of the World, Vol. 12. Picathartes to Tits and Chickadees. Lynx Edicions, Barcelona.

white-browed scimitar babbler
Birds of North India
Birds of Nepal
Birds of Eastern Himalaya
Birds of Southeast Asia
white-browed scimitar babbler
Taxonomy articles created by Polbot